Peter of Coimbra (also known as Peter the Constable) (pronounced ; c. 1429 – Granollers, 30 June 1466), sometimes known as Peter V of Aragon, was the son of Infante Peter, Duke of Coimbra, who became the fifth Constable of Portugal and third Grand Master of the Order of Saint Benedict of Aviz. The Consell de Cent later granted Peter the Crown of Aragon, which he claimed from 1463 to 1466 in opposition to John II. His status as king of Aragon, however, along with that of John II's other challengers, is disputed.

Early life
His parents were Infante Peter, Duke of Coimbra, and Isabella of Urgell. He inherited a claim to the Aragonese throne through his maternal grandfather James II, Count of Urgell, who was the last male descendant of the House of Barcelona and heir to the Crown of Aragon by the rights of agnatic primogeniture.

Maturity 

His father's position as the regent of the Kingdom of Portugal gained him special advantages. In 1443, after the death of his cousin Infante Diogo and by the instigation of his father, Peter was elected the Constable of Portugal, making him one of the most powerful military men in the kingdom. Afonso, Marquis of Valença, the son of his half-uncle Afonso, 1st Duke of Braganza, had expected to become constable, but Peter's father had appoint him instead. This political move along with Afonso V's marriage to Isabella of Coimbra, Peter's sister, instead of the daughter of the Duke of Braganza destroyed the relationship of these former allies.

In 1448, when King Afonso V of Portugal became of age and took reign, the Duke of Coimbra stepped down as regent. Afonso V, because of influence of the Duke of Braganza, who became the political enemy of Peter's father, voided all laws created under Coimbra's regency.
Their disagreements led to the Battle of Alfarrobeira, where the Duke of Coimbra died and Peter was exiled to Castile.

In 1454, Peter reconciled with King Afonso V and the Duke of Braganza, thus allowing him to return to Portugal and reclaim all his family's previous possessions. To further improve his bond with Afonso V, Peter helped Afonso V take Alcácer Ceguer (1458) and Tangiers (1460).

King of Aragon 
In 1463, the Catalan institutions, which were in civil war with John II of Aragon, offered their crown to Peter. He was chosen King of Aragon, Count of Barcelona, and King of Valencia by the Consell de Cent. He reigned de facto in the Principality of Catalonia and parts of the Kingdom of Aragon, but only de jure in Valencia, which was occupied by John II of Aragon. The territory under his control only included Barcelona, most of Catalonia and parts of Aragon.

With the support of his aunt Isabella, the Duchess of Burgundy, he became engaged to Margaret of York, sending her an engagement ring and a marriage contract. Margaret would later marry Isabella's own son Charles the Bold.

Death 
After a long series of military problems, Peter died from illness (or poison, as said by some historians) in 1465, in Granollers. He is buried in Church of Santa Maria del Mar in Barcelona, Catalonia. After his death, the Catalans offered the crown to René of Anjou.

Ancestry

References
"Nobreza de Portugal e do Brasil" – Vol. I, pages 268–270. Published by Zairol Lda., Lisbon 1989.

External links
Genealogical information on Infante John, Lord of Reguengos (in Portuguese)

1429 births
1466 deaths
15th-century Aragonese monarchs
Counts of Barcelona
Portuguese infantes
15th-century Portuguese people
Constables of Portugal